The 2017 Billboard Music Awards ceremony was held at the T-Mobile Arena in Las Vegas, Nevada on May 21, 2017. The list of nominees was announced on April 10, 2017. Non-televised awards were announced on Billboard website the same day as the main ceremony.

Performances

Notes
  Sheeran's performance was pre-recorded at Movistar Arena in Santiago, Chile
  Drake's performance was pre-recorded at The Fountains of Bellagio
  Mars' performance was pre-recorded at Ziggo Dome in Amsterdam, Netherlands

Presenters

	
 Ed Helms and  Kevin Hart presented Top Collaboration
 G-Eazy and  Ashley Tisdale introduced Camila Cabello
 Kate Beckinsale presented Top Male Artist
 Rita Ora introduced The Chainsmokers
 Bebe Rexha and  DJ Khaled introduced Julia Michaels
 Mark Cuban and Sara Foster introduced Ed Sheeran
 Rachel Lindsay and  Savvy Shields presented Top Country Song
 Billy Ray Cyrus and Noah Cyrus introduced Miley Cyrus
 Josh Duhamel presented Top Billboard 200 Album
 Hailee Steinfeld introduced Lorde
 Alexandra Daddario and  Ansel Elgort presented  Top Hot 100 Song
 Sean "Diddy" Combs and CJ Wallace honors B.I.G. Part 1
 Lindsey Stirling and  Logan Paul presented  Top Social Artist
 Lea Michele introduced Celine Dion
 Nicole Scherzinger and  Jussie Smollett presented Top Country Artist
 Rachel Platten and Chris Daughtry presented Billboard Chart Achievement Award
 Olivia Munn introduced Florida Georgia Line and John Legend
 Dan Reynolds honors a tribute to Chris Cornell
 Gwen Stefani presented the Icon Award to Cher
 Prince Michael Jackson presented Top Artist

Winners and nominees
Winners are listed first.

Artists with multiple wins and nominations

References

Billboard Music Award
Billboard awards
2017 in Nevada
2017 music awards